David Field (born 6 June 1961) is an Australian character actor and film director who has appeared in numerous film and television roles, including Chopper, Two Hands and Gettin' Square. In 2009, Field made his directorial debut with The Combination. He is also known for his role in advertisements for Oak as part of the Hungry/Thirsty campaign and as the ex prison inmate uncle in the mini series A Moody Christmas.

Filmography

Film (directing)
The Combination (2009)
Convict (2014)

Film (acting)
 
Expired (a.k.a. Loveland) (2022) as Sam
Mortal Kombat (2021) as Referee
Moon Rock For Monday (2021) as Detective Lionell
The Translator (2020) as Chase
High Ground (2020) as Kurtz
The Combination: Redemption (2019) as White hero
The Pretend One (2017) as Roger
Last Cab to Darwin (2016) as Dougie
Sacred Heart (2016) as Priest
Down Under (2016) as Vic
Now Add Honey (2015) as Roger Gardam
These Final Hours (2014) as Radio Man
The Rover (2014) as Archie
The Inbetweeners 2 (2014) as Uncle Bryan
Convict (2014) as Warden
Battle of the Damned (2013) as Duke
Mystery Road (2013) as Mr Bailey
Careless Love (2013) as Dion
Conniston (2013) (TV movie) as Fred Brooks
Utopia Girls (2012) (TV movie)
The Nothing Men (2008) as David Snedden
$9.99 (2008) as Sammy (voice)
Unfinished Sky (2007) as Sergeant Carl Allen
West (2007) as Doug
Opal Dream (2006) as Jack the Quack
Feed (2005) as Father Turner
Hell Has Harbour Views (2005) (TV movie) as Greg Hogan
Oyster Farmer (2004) as Brownie, Jack’s boss
Tom White (2004) as Phil
BlackJack (2003-07) (series of TV movies) as Inspector Terry Kavanagh
Gettin' Square (2003) as Arnie De Viers
The Night We Called It a Day (2003) as Bob Hawke
Blood Crime (2002) (TV movie) as Jonah Ganz
Silent Partner (2001) as John
Invincible (2001) (TV movie) as Slate
One Night the Moon (2001) as Allman
My Husband My Killer (2001) (TV movie) as Bill Vandenberg
Jet Set (2001) as Roger
Chopper (2000) as Keithy George
Sample People (2000) as TT
Mr. Accident (2000) as Duxton Chevalier / Sir Walter Raleigh
Two Hands (1999) as Acko
Blackrock (1997) as Ken Warner
To Have & to Hold (1996) as Stevie
Dad and Dave: On Our Selection (1995) as Dan
Exile (1994) as Timothy Dullach
Everynight ... Everynight (1994) as Christopher Dale Flannery (Dale)
Broken Highway (1993) as Tatts
Blood Brothers (1993) (TV movie)
Seeing Red (1992) as William
Dadah Is Death (a.k.a. A Long Way From Home) (TV movie) as Mr Travis
Ghosts of the Civil Dead (1988) as Wenzil

Short films
Dark Art (2020) as Simon
The Wrong Barber (2020) as The Barber
Monoliths (2017) as The Driver
A Contramano (2016) as Nico 
Rookie (2016) as Sarge (voice)
Gippsland is Precious (2013) as Narrator
Convenience (2012) as Shop Assistant
Brother (2000) as Brother One
The Order (1999) as Bill
Miss November (1995) as Man
Stitched (1995)

Television

Shantaram (2022) (2 episodes) as Wally Nightingale
Preacher (2019) (7 episodes) as Archangel
Every Family Has A Secret (2019) (1 episode) as Self
The Secret Daughter (2016) as Gus Carter
Changed Forever: The Making of Australia (2016) (miniseries) as Billy Hughes 
Australian Story (2016) as Self
Struggle Street (2015-19) (documentary series) as Narrator
No Activity (2015-18) (11 episodes) as Bruce
Catching Milat (miniseries) (2015) as Detective Neil Birse
The Dalfram Dispute 1938: Pig Iron Bob (documentary) (2015) as Narrator
The Gods of Wheat Street (2014) (miniseries) (5 episodes) as Harry Hamilton
Miss Fisher's Murder Mysteries (2013) (1 episode) as Sergeant Ford
A Moody Christmas (2012) (miniseries) as Rhys
Wild Boys (2011) (10 episodes) as Captain Gunpowder 
Rescue Special Ops (2011) (1 episode) as Sidney ‘Siddy’ Carter
Wilfred (2010) (2 episodes) as Arthur
Rake (2010) (1 episode) as Denny Lorton
City Homicide (2007-11) as Terry Jarvis
Police Files: Unlocked (2007-08) as Self/Host
The Circuit (2006) (TV series) (1 episode) as Kenneth
The Incredible Journey of Mary Bryant (2005) (miniseries) as Thomas
Stingers (2004) (1 episode) as Nick Tascone
Farscape (2002) (1 episode) as Ho’Ock
Grass Roots (2000) (2 episodes) as Daryl Kennedy
Wildside (1998) (1 episode) as Alan Begbie
Water Rats (1997-2000) (4 episodes) as Warren Reith / Doug Harvey
The Beast (1996) (miniseries) as Scranton
Snowy River: The McGregor Saga (1996) as Dave Turner
Blue Heelers (1995-2005) (4 episodes) as Charlie Biden / Michael Doyle
Police Rescue (1992) (1 episode) as Paul
Home and Away (1991) (11 episodes) as Kenny Gibbs
A Country Practice (1990) (2 episodes) as Lenny Jackson
Joe Wilson (1988) (miniseries) as Billy Spicer
Sons and Daughters (1986) (1 episode) as Delivery Man

Music videos

Paul Kelly – If I Could Start Today Again – actor
David Field played the Narrator in the Short Film, All Is Forgiven for Tex, Don and Charlie written and directed by Karen Borger. The film was made to promote the TDC album All Is Forgiven and included a stand-alone video clip for the single Whenever It Snows.

References

External links 
 

AACTA Award winners
Australian male film actors
Australian film directors
Australian male television actors
Helpmann Award winners
Living people
20th-century Australian male actors
21st-century Australian male actors
1961 births